Phyllidia larryi is a species of sea slug, a dorid nudibranch, a shell-less marine gastropod mollusk in the family Phyllidiidae.

Distribution 
This rare species was described from Guam. It has been reported from Japan but there is confusion with Phyllidia zebrina. A similar species is reported from the Hawaiian Islands.

Description
This nudibranch has a yellow dorsum with numerous small tubercles. There are a small number of narrow red or orange lines running from the mantle margin towards the middle of the dorsum.

Diet
This species feeds on a sponge.

References

Phyllidiidae
Gastropods described in 1993